Aya El-Sayed (born May 9, 1989) is an Egyptian épée fencer. El-Sayed represented Egypt at the 2008 Summer Olympics in Beijing, where she competed in the women's individual épée event. She lost the preliminary round of thirty-two match to France's Hajnalka Kiraly Picot, with a score of 7–15.

References

External links
Profile – FIE
NBC Olympics Profile

1989 births
Living people
Egyptian female épée fencers
Olympic fencers of Egypt
Fencers at the 2008 Summer Olympics